Adeola Eunice Oladele Fayehun (born 6 July 1984) is a Nigerian journalist who specializes in discussing current geopolitical, social and economic  issues that affect the daily lives of Africans living on the continent. She is well known for a controversial 2015 on-street interview where she and fellow Sahara TV journalist Omoyele Sowore asked Zimbabwean President Robert Mugabe about when he would be stepping down from office. In 2013, she interviewed former Nigerian President Goodluck Jonathan on the streets of New York, asking him what he was doing about the then on-going Boko Haram insurgency.

Early life 
Fayehun was born in Nigeria. Her parents, Rev. Dr. Solomon Ajayi Oladele and Margaret Ibiladun Oladele (née Abolarin), worked as missionaries in Nigeria. She has five older siblings, and is the youngest child. She comes from Yoruba ethnic group of south-western Nigeria and speaks the language fluently.

Adeola began college in Nigeria working toward a degree in linguistics. In 2003, at the age of 19 years, she moved to the United States to continue college thanks to a scholarship gained through the National Association of Congregational Christian Churches. She graduated from Olivet College in Olivet, Michigan with a B.A. in Mass Communications and Journalism in 2007. During her time at Olivet she worked in radio and was a writer for the Olivet College newspaper. As part of a school project, Fayehun also founded the Olivet College TV Studio. In 2008, Fayehun received a master's degree in broadcast journalism from CUNY Graduate School of Journalism.

Career 
In 2009, after graduate school, Fayehun worked at CUNY TV as a TV news producer. During this time she wrote and produced a feature on Sahara Reporters's Omoyele Sowore, who she later went on to work with in a behind-the-scenes capacity at Sahara Reporters.

In 2010, Fayehun became a U.S. correspondent for the Nigerian newspaper, The Nation, often working freelance.

In 2010, Fayehun founded the online resource, African Spotlight, where she publishes content about Africa.

In April 2011, Fayehun began the news satire program, Keeping It Real with Adeola! on SaharaTV. The show was 30 minutes long and features Fayehun reporting, often in character, on various African news events. The focus of the show was on reporting political issues pertinent to Africa and of interest to the African diaspora community. For the first 150+ episodes created over a period of three years, Fayehun was the producer, writer, and editor of the show.

In November 2017, Fayehun left SaharaTV to work as an independent creator, publishing new content on her YouTube channel about African politics in a continuation of her weekly satire show Keeping It Real with Adeola!.

Often compared to comedian Jon Stewart, Fayehun uses satire and comedy to explain news events in self-produced videos. Fayehun also works as a foreign correspondent for The Nation, a Nigerian national daily newspaper based in Lagos, Nigeria.

Notable interviews 
 2013: Former Nigerian President Goodluck Jonathan on Boko Haram and the Sovereign wealth fund
 2015: Nigerian President Muhammadu Buhari on addressing corruption, the Nigerian economy
 2015: Nigerian Vice President Yemi Osinbajo
 2015: Zimbabwe President Robert Mugabe on ending presidency, as he attended the inauguration of the Nigerian President Muhammadu Buhari on 29 May.

Honors 
 2008: Foreign Press Association, New York, NY, "Outstanding Academic And Professional Achievement"
 2014: Ethiopian Satellite News Network (ESAT), Washington DC, "Excellence In Journalism For Democracy Award"
 2015: CUNY Graduate School of Journalism, "Best One Woman Show"

Personal life 
In 2011, Fayehun married Victor Fayehun in Nigeria. Fayehun and her husband created a non-profit foundation called KIRWA Foundation that provides aid to terminally ill in Africa.

References

External links 
 
 Keeping It Real with Adeola!

CUNY Graduate School of Journalism alumni
Olivet College alumni
Nigerian women journalists
Yoruba women journalists
1984 births
Living people
Nigerian YouTubers
Nigerian expatriates in the United States
Nigerian reporters and correspondents
Yoruba people
Yoruba journalists
The Nation